Bangittigudihal is a village in Dharwad district of Karnataka, India.

Demographics
As of the 2011 Census of India there were 418 households in Bangittigudihal and a total population of 2,263 consisting of 1,193 males and 1,070 females. There were 288 children ages 0-6.

References

Villages in Dharwad district